The 2006 FIFA World Cup qualification UEFA Group 4 was a UEFA qualifying group for the 2006 FIFA World Cup. The group comprised Cyprus, Faroe Islands, France, Republic of Ireland, Israel and Switzerland.

The group was won by France, who qualified for the 2006 FIFA World Cup. The runners-up Switzerland entered the UEFA qualification play-offs.

Standings

Results

Goalscorers

6 goals

 Alexander Frei

4 goals

 Michalis Konstantinou
 Djibril Cissé
 Robbie Keane
 Yossi Benayoun
 Johan Vonlanthen

3 goals

 Clinton Morrison
 Avi Nimni
 Alexandre Rey

2 goals

 Ioannis Okkas
 Rógvi Jacobsen
 Ludovic Giuly
 Thierry Henry
 Sylvain Wiltord
 Ian Harte
 Walid Badir
 Adoram Keisi

1 goal

 Efstathios Aloneftis
 Asimakis Krassas
 Claus Bech Jørgensen
 Símun Samuelsen
 Vikash Dhorasoo
 David Trezeguet
 Zinedine Zidane
 Stephen Elliott
 Kevin Kilbane
 Andy Reid
 Yaniv Katan
 Abbas Souan
 Avi Yehiel
 Michael Zandberg
 Daniel Gygax
 Ludovic Magnin
 Philippe Senderos
 Raphaël Wicky
 Hakan Yakin

1 own goal

 Súni Olsen (playing against France)

See also 

4
2004–05 in French football
qual
2004–05 in Israeli football
2005–06 in Israeli football
2004 in Republic of Ireland association football
2005 in Republic of Ireland association football
2004–05 in Cypriot football
2005–06 in Cypriot football
2004–05 in Swiss football
2005–06 in Swiss football
2004 in Faroe Islands football
2005 in Faroe Islands football